Wild Willy Barrett's Mound of Sound is the fifth solo album by Wild Willy Barrett; released in 1997, it is a collection of newly-written folk songs. The album features contributions from fellow Buckinghamshire guitarist "John Cadman" and "Bad Attitude" a collective made up of Carl Taylor and Stephen Two-Names; Mickey Mouse guy, on his third solo album, Organic Bondage.

Track list

Personnel
Wild Willy Barrett - harmonium (1, 3), guitar (2, 6, 9), balalaika (3), slide guitar (4), eggneck guitar (5), ukulele (6]
Mark Freeman - cardboard box (3, 5), marching drum (3, 9), waste bin (3), Tunisian drum (6)
Birgitta Herminegildus van Dongen - vocals (3, 5, 6, 10)
John Cadman - lute (7, 11), bandora (10)

References

1997 albums